Samuel Filadelfo Vacanti (March 20, 1922 – December 17, 1981) was an American football quarterback.

Vacanti was born in Omaha, Nebraska in 1922 and attended Omaha Tech High School. He played college football at the University of Iowa (1941-1942), Purdue University (1943), and the University of Nebraska–Lincoln (1946). He led Purdue to the 1943 Big Ten championship. He missed the 1944 and 1945 seasons while serving in the United States Marine Corps during World War II.

He played professional football in the All-America Football Conference for the Chicago Rockets and Baltimore Colts from 1947 to 1949. He appeared in 39 professional football games, 16 of them as a starter, and totaled 2,338 passing yards.

He rejoined the Marines during the Korean War and attained the rank of major. He served on the Omaha City Council from 1965 to 1969 and worked as a life insurance agent. He died in 1981 in Omaha.

References

1922 births
1981 deaths
American football quarterbacks
Chicago Rockets players
Baltimore Colts players
Nebraska Cornhuskers football players
Iowa Hawkeyes football players
Purdue Boilermakers football players
Players of American football from Nebraska
People from Omaha, Nebraska
United States Marine Corps personnel of World War II
Baltimore Colts (1947–1950) players